The 1933 All England Championships was a badminton tournament held at the Royal Horticultural Halls, Westminster, England from March 6 to March 10, 1933.

Final results

Results

Men's singles

+ Denotes seed

Women's singles

References

All England Open Badminton Championships
All England
All England Open Badminton Championships in London
1933 in badminton
March 1933 sports events
1933 in London